Buffalo Prairie may refer to:
Buffalo Prairie Township, Rock Island County, Illinois
Buffalo Prairie, Illinois